Sleeping with the Enemy is a 1991 American psychological thriller film directed by Joseph Ruben and starring Julia Roberts, Patrick Bergin and Kevin Anderson. The film is based on Nancy Price's 1987 novel of the same name. Roberts plays a woman who fakes her own death and moves to escape from her controlling abusive husband, but finds her peaceful new life interrupted when he discovers her actions and tracks her down from Cape Cod to Cedar Falls, Iowa.

Sleeping with the Enemy was released theatrically on February 8, 1991, where it received negative reviews from the critics, but was a box office success, grossing $175 million on a production budget of $19 million. The film also broke the record at the time for the highest domestic opening for a film with a female lead, grossing $13 million on its opening weekend surpassing the previous record held by Aliens, which grossed $10 million in its first weekend.

Plot
Laura Burney has a seemingly idyllic life and perfect marriage to Martin, a successful Boston investment counselor. Beneath Martin's charming, handsome exterior, however, is an obsessive and controlling personality who has physically, emotionally, and sexually abused Laura throughout their nearly four-year marriage. Then, in a recurring pattern, he apologetically showers her with flowers and gifts.

Martin accepts the invitation of their neighbor, a doctor, for an evening sail, despite knowing Laura fears water. As a severe storm unexpectedly rolls in, Martin and the doctor struggle to control the vessel. Laura, unable to swim, is swept overboard. After an extensive Coast Guard search, Laura is presumed dead from drowning and Martin is inconsolable.

After some time, Laura is actually alive. After secretly learning to swim, she planned to fake her own death to escape Martin's abuse. During the storm, she jumped overboard, swam ashore, and returned home. She cut her hair, donned a wig, took her stashed belongings and money, and headed to the bus station.

Laura moves to Cedar Falls, Iowa. Previously, she told Martin that her blind, stroke-impaired mother, Chloe, died, but secretly moved Chloe to an Iowa nursing home. She rents a house, finds a job, and settles into a new life as "Sara Waters". Her friendly next-door neighbor, Ben Woodward, a young drama teacher at a local college, is attracted to Laura, though he suspects she has a troubled past. They have a fun date, but when a kiss turns more physical, Laura resists and demands that Ben leave. She later confides to him that she escaped an abusive marriage.

Martin receives information indicating Laura may be alive. This is confirmed when he finds Laura's wedding ring, where she had flushed it down the toilet but it had failed to flush. He travels to Chloe's nursing home, posing as a detective, and learns that Chloe's "nephew" has just visited. Laura, disguised as a man, is also at the nursing home, and barely misses encountering Martin. Martin discovers Laura's whereabouts and learns about Ben. He trails the couple to Laura's house and breaks in while she and Ben are outside. Laura notices the small clues Martin deliberately left inside the house, the hand towels being perfectly aligned and the contents of the kitchen cabinets rearranged to Martin's exact standards.

Martin confronts Laura and Ben breaks down the door and struggles with Martin, who knocks him unconscious. As he aims a gun at Ben, Laura distracts him, then knees his groin. She grabs Martin's gun and holds him at gunpoint. As Laura calls the police, Martin expects her to tell the police to protect her from him, as she had done in the past, but Laura shocks Martin by informing the police she killed an intruder, and then shoots Martin three times. Wounded from the shots, Martin seizes Laura by the hair and grabs the gun, aiming it at her in a desperate attempt to kill her, but the gun clicks empty. Martin then dies from his wounds, while Laura and Ben embrace and wait for the police.

Cast
 Julia Roberts as Laura Williams Burney / Sara Waters
 Patrick Bergin as Martin Burney
 Kevin Anderson as Ben Woodward
 Elizabeth Lawrence as Chloe Williams 
 Kyle Secor as John Fleishman
 Claudette Nevins Dr. Rissner
 Tony Abatemarco as Locke
 Marita Geraghty as Julie
 Harley Venton	as Garber
 Nancy Fish as the woman on bus 
 Sandi Shackelford as Edna
 Bonnie Johnson as Iris Neppert

Release

Critical reception
, the film held a 22% "Rotten" rating based on 37 reviews on Rotten Tomatoes. The site's consensus states: "A game Julia Roberts gives it her all, but Sleeping with the Enemy is one stalker thriller that's unlikely to inspire many obsessions of its own."

Roger Ebert gave the film 1.5 stars out of a possible 4 upon its release, saying while the film had good performances and the opening scenes "briefly seemed to have greatness in its grasp", Sleeping with the Enemy quickly fell into cliches and plot holes and became "a slasher movie in disguise, an up-market version of the old exploitation formula where the victim can run, but she can't hide." Another mostly negative review came from Owen Gleiberman of Entertainment Weekly, who wrote that the film "has the bare bones of a tantalizing thriller" and praised Robert's performance ("you can practically feel her pulse"), but also felt Bergin's role was too "mechanical" to be believed, and placing blame on the "deadwood" script.

Box office
The film's opening ended Home Alones twelve week run atop the box office. By the end of its run, the film had grossed $101,599,005 in the domestic box office; with an international total of $73,400,000, the film's worldwide gross was $174,999,005; based on a $19 million budget, the film was a box office success. The film was released in the United Kingdom on April 12, 1991, and opened on #2, behind Highlander II: The Quickening. The next week, the film remained in the same position.

Soundtrack
The original music for the film was composed and conducted by Jerry Goldsmith. Columbia Records released an album concurrently with the film containing just over 38 minutes of score plus the Van Morrison song "Brown Eyed Girl". In 2011, La-La Land Records issued a limited edition album of 3500 copies expanding Goldsmith's score (but omitting the song).

Home media
The film reached #1 in the rental charts in September 1991. It was released on LaserDisc in Australia, the United States, United Kingdom and Japan by Fox Video in 1991. It also received various releases on VHS, was released on DVD on 2 September 2003, and subsequently entered the market of Blu-ray in June 2011. As of October 2020, it still hasn't been released on 4K.

Awards
The score by Jerry Goldsmith won the BMI Film Music Award, 1992, and the film was nominated for the Academy of Science Fiction, Fantasy & Horror Films Saturn Award for 1992 in four categories: Best Actress (Roberts), Saturn Award for Best Supporting Actor (Bergin), Best Horror Film and Best Music (Goldsmith).

Remakes
In February 2019, it was reported that a remake of Sleeping with the Enemy was in development at Fox Searchlight Pictures, with Nia DaCosta helming the project. However, there have been other remakes of the film shown below.

References

External links

 
 
 
 

1991 films
1990s erotic thriller films
1990s psychological thriller films
1990s thriller drama films
1990s erotic drama films
20th Century Fox films
American erotic thriller films
American psychological thriller films
American thriller drama films
Cross-dressing in American films
American erotic drama films
Films about domestic violence
Films about narcissism
Films about obsessive–compulsive disorder
Films about stalking
Films based on American novels
Films directed by Joseph Ruben
Films scored by Jerry Goldsmith
Films set in Iowa
Films set in Massachusetts
Films shot in North Carolina
Films shot in South Carolina
Mariticide in fiction
Films with screenplays by Ronald Bass
American neo-noir films
1991 drama films
1990s English-language films
1990s American films